The 2006 Elections for the Pennsylvania State Senate were held on November 7, 2006, with even-numbered districts being contested. Necessary primary elections were held on May 16, 2006. State Senators are elected for four-year terms, with half of the Senate seats up for a vote every two years. Members elected in 2006 were inaugurated on January 2, 2007.

The Senate elections saw no seats change parties, with the Republicans holding onto an eight-seat majority. Senate Republican floor leader, David J. Brightbill, was defeated for in the primary election by tire salesman Mike Folmer. President pro tempore Robert C. Jubelirer was defeated for re-election by fellow Republican and Blair County commissioner John Eichelberger. Three Republican senators, Joe Conti, Charles D. Lemmond Jr., Noah W. Wenger, retired and were succeeded by Chuck McIlhinney, Lisa Baker, and Michael W. Brubaker, respectively.

General election

See also
 Pennsylvania State Senate
 Pennsylvania House of Representatives elections, 2006

References
 
 
 

2006 Pennsylvania elections
2006
Pennsylvania Senate